Martina Hingis and Sania Mirza were the defending champions, but chose not to participate together. Mirza teamed up with Barbora Strýcová, but lost in the quarterfinals to Caroline Garcia and Kristina Mladenovic. Hingis played alongside CoCo Vandeweghe, but lost in the semifinals to Garcia and Mladenovic. 

Bethanie Mattek-Sands and Lucie Šafářová won the title, defeating Garcia and Mladenovic in the final, 2–6, 7–6(7–5), 6–4. It was their third Grand Slam title together.

Seeds

Draw

Finals

Top half

Section 1

Section 2

Bottom half

Section 3

Section 4

Other entry information

Wild cards

Protected ranking

Alternates

Notes

External links
 Women's Doubles Main Draw
2016 US Open – Women's draws and results at the International Tennis Federation

Women's Doubles
US Open - Women's Doubles
US Open (tennis) by year – Women's doubles
2016 in American women's sports